Sokolec may refer to the following places:
Sokolec, Lower Silesian Voivodeship (south-west Poland)
Sokolec, Greater Poland Voivodeship (west-central Poland)
Sokoleč (Czech Republic)